The 1978 Icelandic Cup was the 19th edition of the National Football Cup.

It took place between 30 May 1975 and 27 August 1978, with the final played at Laugardalsvöllur in Reykjavik. The cup was important, as winners qualified for the UEFA Cup Winners' Cup (if a club won both the league and the cup, the defeated finalists would take their place in the Cup Winners' Cup).

The 10 clubs from the 1. Deild entered in the last 16, with clubs from lower tiers entering in the three preliminary rounds. Teams played one-legged matches. In case of a draw, the match was replayed at the opposition's ground.

ÍA Akranes won their first Icelandic Cup, beating Valur Reykjavik in the final. The club therefore qualified for Europe.

First round

Second round

Third round

Fourth round 

 Entry of ten teams from the 1. Deild

Quarter finals

Semi finals

Final 

 ÍA Akranes won their fourth Icelandic Cup and qualified for the 1979–80 European Cup Winners' Cup.

See also 

 1978 Úrvalsdeild
 Icelandic Men's Football Cup

External links 
  1978 Icelandic Cup results at the site of the Icelandic Football Federation

Icelandic Men's Football Cup
Iceland
1978 in Iceland